"East of the Sun and West of the Moon" is a Norwegian fairy tale. It was included by Andrew Lang in The Blue Fairy Book (1890).

"East of the Sun and West of the Moon" was collected by Peter Christen Asbjørnsen and Jørgen Moe.  It is Aarne–Thompson type 425A, the search for the lost husband; other tales of this type include "Black Bull of Norroway", "The Brown Bear of Norway", "The Daughter of the Skies", "The Enchanted Pig", "The Tale of the Hoodie", "Master Semolina", "The Sprig of Rosemary", "The Enchanted Snake", and "White-Bear-King-Valemon". The Swedish version is called "Prince Hat under the Ground". It was likely an offspring from the tale of "Cupid and Psyche" in The Golden Ass, which gave rise to similar animal bridegroom cycles such as "Beauty and the Beast".

Synopsis
The White Bear approaches a poor peasant and asks if he will give him his prettiest and youngest daughter; in return, the bear will make the man rich. The girl is reluctant, so the peasant asks the bear to return, and in the meantime, persuades her to marry the bear. The White Bear takes her off to a magnificent enchanted castle. At night, he discards his bear form, and comes to her bed as a man. She never sees him, however, because he enters her bedroom after she extinguishes the light, and leaves before daybreak.

When she grows homesick, the bear agrees that she might go home as long as she agrees that she will never speak with her mother alone, but only when other people are around. At home, her family welcomes her, and her mother makes persistent attempts to speak with her alone. She finally persuades her daughter to disclose the entire account about the strange man who sleeps beside her in the dark each night, and leaves before daybreak. In response to the girl's story, she insists that the White Bear must really be a troll, gives her a candle, and tells her to light it at night, to see who is sharing her bed, warning her not to spill any tallow.

The girl obeys, and discovers that the bear is actually an attractive prince. Falling in love with him at first sight, she kisses him, and spills three drops of tallow on him. Waking him, thus, she is told that if she had waited for a year, he would have been free, but now he must go to his wicked stepmother, a witch-queen who turned him into his form and lives in a castle that lies "east of the Sun and west of the Moon", and marry her daughter, a witch-princess.

In the morning, the girl finds that the palace has vanished. She sets out in search of the prince.  Coming to a great mountain, she finds an old woman playing with a golden apple. She asks the old woman if she knows the way to the castle that lies east of the Sun and west of the Moon. The old woman cannot tell her the way, but lends her a horse to ride to a neighbor who might be able to, and gives her the apple. The neighbor is sitting outside another mountain, with a golden carding comb. She, also, does not know the way to the castle, but lends the girl another horse to ride to another neighbor who might know, and gives her the carding comb. That third old woman does not know the way to the castle either, but lends the girl another horse to ride to the East Wind, and gives her the golden spinning wheel with which she had been working.

The East Wind has never been to the castle that lies east of the Sun and west of the Moon, but believes his stronger brother, the West Wind might have been there. He takes her to the West Wind, who brings her to the South Wind for the same reason. The South Wind brings her to the North Wind, again, for the same reason. The North Wind says he once exhausted himself blowing an aspen leaf to her desired destination, but would take her there if she was absolutely determined to go there. The girl says she is determined to go there, and so, he takes her there.

The morning after her arrival at the queen's castle, the girl starts to play with the golden apple. The queen's daughter, who is betrothed to the prince, sees the golden plaything, and says to the girl that she would like to buy it. The girl agrees to part with it in exchange for a night with the prince. The princess agrees to the exchange, but gives the prince a sleeping drink, so that he cannot be woken up. These events recur the next night, after the girl gives the princess the gold carding comb. This time, the girl's weeping and plaintive utterances, as she attempts to awaken the prince, are overheard by imprisoned townspeople within the castle. They report to him what they had overheard. On the third day, the princess agrees to another night in the prince's bedchamber in exchange for the girl's golden spinning wheel. That night, the prince does not drink the potion that the princess brings him, and so, he is awake for the girl's visit.

The prince tells her how she can save him: He will declare that he will marry anyone who can wash out the tallow stains from his shirt, since his stepmother and her daughter cannot do it. He would call on the girl for this purpose. When she succeeds, he would claim her for his bride. The plan works out, and rage causes the two witches to explode. The spell is broken, and the prince no longer needs to assume his bear form during the day. He and his bride free the prisoners within the castle, and leave it far behind them with all the gold and silver that had been housed within it.

Variants
Finnish folklorist Oskar Hackman summarized a Finnish-Swedish tale from Vörå. In this tale, a large-nosed woman wants to marry a handsome man, but he rebuffs her. The woman, then, curses him to become a bear. The bear wanders to the forest and finds a hut, where a man lives with his daughter. The animal asks for the man's daughter, in exchange for getting some financial benefits. The bear and the girl live like husband and wife, but he becomes a man at night, and disappears during the day, and she cannot light any candle at home. Eventually, the girl goes back to her father's home and returns with some candles. She lights a candle and sees her bear husband is, in fact, a handsome man. A drop of tallow falls in his shirt, he wakes up and says they must depart. The girl is given a gold spinning wheel and is sent back to her father's hut. The girl decides to go after him and finds him at the house of the large-nosed woman. She tries to sell the spinning wheel for a night with the bear (in human form), but cannot wake him up. On the third night, the girl sells it to the large-nosed woman and wakes him up. The girl and the man decide to play a trick on the large-nosed woman: he will set a challenge for his future bride to wash the tallow spot on his shirt. The large-nosed woman and her maidservants fail, but the girl washes the shirt. For her failure, the large-nosed woman bursts, and the man marries the girl.

Analysis

Tale type 
In folktales classified as tale type ATU 425A, "The Search for the Lost Husband" or "The Animal as Bridegroom", the maiden breaks a taboo or burns the husband's animal skin and, to atone, she must wear down a numbered pair of metal shoes. On her way to her husband, she asks for the help of the Sun, the Moon and the Wind. According to Hans-Jörg Uther, the main feature of tale type ATU 425A is "bribing the false bride for three nights with the husband". Østenfor sol og vestenfor måne is also the name given to more general tale type ATU 425 ("The Search for the Lost Husband") in 's The Types of the Norwegian Folktale.

Retellings and translations into English

 Eastward of the Sun, and Westward of the Moon, 1849, by Anthony R. Montalba, in Fairy Tales From all Nations. London: Chapman and Hall, 1849.
 The Mysterious Prince, 1908, by Wilbur Herschel Williams, in Fairy Tales From Folk Lore. New York: Moffat, Yard & Company, 1908.
 East o' the Sun & West o' the Moon, 1910, translated by Sir George Webbe Dasent and illustrated by the brothers Reginald L. Knowles and Horace J. Knowles.
 East o' the Sun & West o' the Moon, translated by G. W. Dasent (1910), illustrated by P. J. Lynch.
 East of the Sun & West of the Moon, 1914, translated by G. W. Dasent (1910), illustrated by Kay Nielsen.
 "East of the Sun and West of the Moon", The Dancing Bears, 1954, by W. S. Merwin
 East of the Sun and West of the Moon retold by Kathleen and Michael Hague and illustrated by Michael Hague (Harcourt Brace Jovanovich, 1980) .
 East of the Sun & West of the Moon, 1980, written and illustrated by Mercer Mayer
 East of the Sun, West of the Moon, by D. J. MacHale, illustrated by Vivienne Flesher (Rabbit Ears Productions).
 East of the Sun & West of the Moon, 1994, play by Tina Howe.
 East of the Sun, West of the Moon. Adapted by Anthony Ravenhall for the stage: Cleveland Theatre Company (CTC) in 1994. Directed by Anthony Ravenhall, toured Christmas 1994/5. Also toured 1996/97 Northumberland Theatre Company (NTC).
 Once Upon a Winter's Night, 2001, by Dennis L. McKiernan
 East, 2003, novel by Edith Pattou.
 Sun and Moon, Ice and Snow, 2009, by Jessica Day George
 Ice, 2009, novel by Sarah Beth Durst.
 Enchanted: East of the sun, West of the moon, by Nancy Madore.
 East of the Sun, West of the Moon, 2013, written and illustrated by Jackie Morris.
 A Court of Thorns and Roses, 2015, by Sarah J. Maas.
 Echo North, 2019, novel by Joanna Ruth Meyer.
 Beautiful, 2019, audiobook by Juliet Marillier.

Film adaptations
 In the early 1980s, Don Bluth Productions began work on an animated feature film entitled East of the Sun and West of the Moon. Ultimately, the film was never made due to a loss of financial backing, even though the film was heavily into production at the time of its cancellation.
 Max von Sydow narrates the Rabbit Ears Productions' version of "East of the Sun and West of the Moon" to musical accompaniment by Lyle Mays.
 The Storyteller features the episode "The True Bride", which was directly based on a German folktale of the same name, but references this story in its ending. The heroine's love is bewitched by a female troll into forgetting her, but the prince is told the truth by the troll's prisoners. In the episode "Hans My Hedgehog" the husband also turns from a beast into a human.
 The themes of "East of the Sun and West of the Moon" appear in the 1991 film The Polar Bear King, also known as Kvitebjørn Kong Valemon. The story of the film is almost an exact parallel to the fairy tale.

Illustrations by Kay Nielsen (1914)

See also

 
 
 
 
 
 
 
 The Story of the Abandoned Princess - Norwegian fairy tale
 
 
 
 Tulisa, the Wood-Cutter's Daughter (Indian folktale)

Footnotes

References

External links

SurLaLune Fairy Tales, annotated version of East of the Sun and West of the Moon
East of the Sun and West of the Moon in full length

 

Norwegian fairy tales
Scandinavian folklore
Witchcraft in fairy tales
Fiction about shapeshifting
ATU 400-459
Asbjørnsen and Moe
False hero
Bears in popular culture
Polar bears in popular culture